Alfredo Donelli was a leading Italian cinematographer who worked on a number of silent films
including the largely abandoned Italian-shot scenes of MGM's blockbuster Ben-Hur: A Tale of the Christ (1925). For Italian studios he worked on big-budget epics such as Quo Vadis (1924) and The Last Days of Pompeii (1926).

Along with Edmundo Orlandi he invented the Avia compact camera.

Selected filmography
 Francesca da Rimini (1922)
 Quo Vadis (1924)
 The Fiery Cavalcade (1925)
 Ben-Hur: A Tale of the Christ (1925)
 The Last Days of Pompeii (1926)
 The Storyteller of Venice (1929)
 Girls Do Not Joke (1929)

References

Bibliography
 Souto, H. Mario Raimondo. Motion Picture Photography: A History, 1891-1960. McFarland, 2007.

External links

Year of birth unknown
Year of death unknown
Italian cinematographers